Lyudinovsky District is an administrative and municipal district (raion), one of the twenty-four in Kaluga Oblast, Russia. It is located in the southwest of the oblast. Its administrative center is the town of Lyudinovo. Population:  4,864 (2002 Census);  The population of Lyudinovo accounts for 71.7% of the district's total population.

References

Notes

Sources

Districts of Kaluga Oblast